Richard Lee Coffey (born September 2, 1965) is an American former professional basketball player who had a brief stint with the NBA's Minnesota Timberwolves.

Prior to his college basketball career he was a member of the US Army's 82nd Airborne Division Paratrooper.

Coffey, a 6'6" and 212 lb forward born in Aurora, North Carolina and who played collegiately for the University of Minnesota Golden Gophers, averaged 1.3 points and 1.5 rebounds in 52 games for the Timberwolves during the 1990–91 NBA season. After leaving the NBA, he played in the Continental Basketball Association, in Turkey and Spain. He played for the Isuzu Motors Lynx of Japan in 1993.

He is the father of Amir Coffey, Nia Coffey, and Sydney Coffey.

References

External links
NBA stats @ basketballreference.com
TBLStat.net Profile

1965 births
Living people
Akita Isuzu/Isuzu Motors Lynx/Giga Cats players
American men's basketball players
Basketball players from North Carolina
Minnesota Golden Gophers men's basketball players
Minnesota Timberwolves players
People from Beaufort County, North Carolina
Shooting guards
Undrafted National Basketball Association players